3318 Blixen, provisionally designated , is a stony Eoan asteroid from the outer region of the asteroid belt, approximately 23 kilometers in diameter. It was discovered by Danish astronomers Poul Jensen and Karl Augustesen at Brorfelde Observatory on 23 April 1985.

Blixen is a member of the Eos family, the largest asteroid family in the outer main belt consisting of nearly 10,000 asteroids. It orbits the Sun at a distance of 2.9–3.2 AU once every 5 years and 3 months (1,905 days). Its orbit has an eccentricity of 0.05 and an inclination of 12° with respect to the ecliptic.

Photometric observations of this asteroid collected during 2006 show a rotation period of 6.456 ± 0.003 hours with a brightness variation of 0.20 ± 0.02 magnitude.

This minor planet was named after Danish novelist Karen Blixen (1885–1962), best known for the memoir Out of Africa. The approved naming citation was published by the Minor Planet Center on 18 September 1986.

References

External links 
 Lightcurve plot of 3318 Blixen, Palmer Divide Observatory, B. D. Warner (2006)
 Asteroid Lightcurve Database (LCDB), query form (info )
 Dictionary of Minor Planet Names, Google books
 Asteroids and comets rotation curves, CdR – Observatoire de Genève, Raoul Behrend
 Discovery Circumstances: Numbered Minor Planets (1)-(5000) – Minor Planet Center
 
 

Eos asteroids
Blixen
Blixen
Blixen
Karen Blixen
19850423